Resistant starch (RS) is starch, including its degradation products, that escapes from digestion in the small intestine of healthy individuals. Resistant starch occurs naturally in foods, but it can also be added as part of dried raw foods, or used as an additive in manufactured foods.

Some types of resistant starch (RS1, RS2 and RS3) are fermented by the large intestinal microbiota, conferring benefits to human health through the production of short-chain fatty acids, increased bacterial mass, and promotion of butyrate-producing bacteria.

Resistant starch has similar physiological effects as dietary fiber, behaving as a mild laxative and possibly causing flatulence.

Origin and history 
The concept of resistant starch arose from research in the 1970s and is currently considered to be one of three starch types: rapidly digested starch, slowly digested starch and resistant starch, each of which may affect levels of blood glucose.

The European Commission-supported-research eventually led to a definition of resistant starch.

Health effects 
Resistant starch does not release glucose within the small intestine, but rather reaches the large intestine where it is consumed or fermented by colonic bacteria (gut microbiota). On a daily basis, human intestinal microbiota encounter more carbohydrates than any other dietary component. This includes resistant starch, non-starch polysaccharide fibers, oligosaccharides, and simple sugars which have significance in colon health.

The fermentation of resistant starch produces short-chain fatty acids, including acetate, propionate, and butyrate and increased bacterial cell mass. The short-chain fatty acids are produced in the large intestine where they are rapidly absorbed from the colon, then are metabolized in colonic epithelial cells, liver or other tissues. The fermentation of resistant starch produces more butyrate than other types of dietary fibers.

Studies have shown that resistant starch supplementation was well tolerated. Modest amounts of gases such as carbon dioxide, methane, and hydrogen are also produced in intestinal fermentation. One review estimated that the acceptable daily intake of resistant starch may be as high as 45 grams in adults, an amount exceeding the total recommended intake for dietary fiber of 25–38 grams per day. When isolated resistant starch is used to substitute for flour in foods, the glycemic response of that food is reduced.

There is limited evidence that resistant starch can improve fasting glucose, fasting insulin, insulin resistance and sensitivity, especially in individuals who are diabetic, overweight or obese. In 2016, the U.S. FDA approved a qualified health claim stating that resistant starch might reduce the risk of type 2 diabetes, but with qualifying language for product labels that limited scientific evidence exists to support this claim. Because qualified health claims are issued when the science evidence is weak or not consistent, the FDA requires specific labeling language, such as the guideline concerning resistant starch: "High-amylose maize resistant starch may reduce the risk of Type 2 diabetes. FDA has concluded that there is limited scientific evidence for this claim."

Resistant starch may reduce appetite, especially with doses of 25 grams or more. 

Resistant starch may reduce low-density cholesterol.

There is limited evidence that resistant starch might improve inflammatory biomarkers, including interleukin-6, tumor necrosis factor alpha, and C-reactive protein.

Resistant starch does not appear to reduce colorectal cancer risk but may have benefits in reducing the risk of extracolonic cancers in individuals with a high genetic risk for cancer, including those in the upper gastrointestinal tract that are difficult to identify.

Starch structure 
Plants store starch in tightly packed granules, consisting of layers of amylose and amylopectin. The size and shape of the starch granule varies by botanical source.  For instance, the average size of potato starch is approximately 38 micrometers, wheat starch an average of 22 micrometers and rice starch approximately 8 micrometers.

{| class="wikitable"
|-
! colspan=4 | Starch granule characteristics
|-
! Starch || Diameter, microns (micrometers) || Granule Shape ||Gelatinization temp, °C
|-
| Maize / corn || align=center | 5-30|| Round, Polygonal || align=center | 62-72
|-
| Waxy maize || align=center | 5-30|| Round, Polygonal || align=center | 63-72
|-
| Tapioca || align=center | 4-35 || Oval, Truncated ||align=center | 62-73
|-
| Potato || align=center | 5-100 ||Oval, Spherical || align=center | 59-68
|-
| Wheat || align=center | 1-45||Round, Lenticular|| align=center | 58-64
|-
| Rice || align=center | 3-8 ||Polygonal, Spherical Compound granules ||align=center | 68-78
|-
| High amylose maize ||align=center | 5-30||Polygonal, Irregular Elongated || align=center | 63-92 (not gelatinized in boiling water)
|}

Raw starch granules resist digestion, e.g., raw bananas, raw potatoes. This does not depend on the amylose or amylopectin content, but rather the structure of the granule protecting the starch.

When starch granules are cooked, water is absorbed into the granule causing swelling and increased size. In addition, amylose chains can leak out as the granule swells. The viscosity of the solution increases as the temperature is increased. The gelatinization temperature is defined as the temperature at which maximum gelatinization or swelling of the starch granule has occurred. This is also the point of maximum viscosity. Further cooking will burst the granule apart completely, releasing all of the glucose chains. In addition, viscosity is reduced as the granules are destroyed. The glucose chains can reassociate into short crystalline structures, which typically involves rapid recrystallization of amylose molecules followed by a slow recrystallization of amylopectin molecules in a process called retrogradation.

Plants produce starch with different types of structure and shape characteristics which may affect digestion. For instance, smaller starch granules are more available to enzyme digestion because the larger percentage of surface area increases the enzyme binding rate.

Starch consists of amylose and amylopectin which affect the textural properties of manufactured foods. Cooked starches with high amylose content generally have increased resistant starch.

Definition and categorization 
Resistant starch (RS) is any starch or starch digestion products that are not digested and absorbed in the stomach or small intestine and pass on to the large intestine. RS has been categorized into five types:

 RS1 – Physically inaccessible or undigestible resistant starch, such as that found in seeds or legumes and unprocessed whole grains. This starch is bound within the fibrous cell walls of the aforementioned foods.
 RS2 – Resistant starch is inaccessible to enzymes due to starch conformation, as in green bananas, raw potatoes, and high amylose corn starch.
 RS3 – Resistant starch that is formed when starch-containing foods (e.g. rice, potatoes) are cooked and cooled, such as pasta. Occurs due to retrogradation, which refers to the collective processes of dissolved starch becoming less soluble after being heated and dissolved in water and then cooled.
 RS4 – Starches that have been chemically modified to resist digestion.
 RS5 – Starches that are complexed with lipids.

Processing effects
Processing may affect the natural resistant starch content of foods.  In general, processes that break down structural barriers to digestion reduce resistant starch content, with greater reductions resulting from processing. Whole grain wheat may contain as high as 14% resistant starch, while milled wheat flour may contain only 2%. Resistant starch content of cooked rice may decrease due to grinding or cooking.

Other types of processing increase resistant starch content. If cooking includes excess water, the starch is gelatinized and becomes more digestible. However, if these starch gels are then cooled, they can form starch crystals resistant to digestive enzymes (Type RS3 or retrograded resistant starch), such as those occurring in cooked and cooled cereals or potatoes (e.g., potato salad). Cooling boiled potatoes overnight at 4°C (39.2°F) was found to increase the amount of resistant starch by a factor of 2.8.

High amylose varieties of corn, wheat, barley, potato and rice have been naturally bred to increase the resistant starch content that will survive baking and mild extrusion processing, which enables the delivery of resistant starch in processed foods.

Nutritional information 
Resistant starch is considered both a dietary fiber and a functional fiber, depending on whether it is naturally in foods or added. Although the U.S. Institute of Medicine has defined total fiber as equal to functional fiber plus dietary fiber, U.S. food labeling does not distinguish between them.

{| class="wikitable"
|-
! colspan=4 | Examples of naturally occurring resistant starch
|-
! Food || Serving size  (1 cup is ≈227 grams) || Resistant starch  (grams) || grams per 100 grams (%)

|-
| Banana flour, from green bananas || 1 cup, uncooked || align=center | 42–52.8 || align=center | ~20.9 (dry)
|-
| Banana, raw, slightly green || 1 medium, peeled || align=center | 4.7
|-
| High amylose RS2 corn resistant starch || 1 tablespoon (9.5 g) || align=center | 4.5 || align=center | 47.4 (dry)
|-
| High amylose RS2 wheat resistant starch || 1/4 cup (30 g) || align=center | 5.0 || align=center | 16.7
|-
| Oats, rolled || 1 cup, uncooked (81.08 g) || align=center | 17.6 || align=center | 21.7 (dry)
|-
| Green peas, frozen || 1 cup, cooked (160 g) || align=center | 4.0 || align=center | 2.5
|-
| White beans || 1 cup, cooked (179 g) || align=center | 7.4 || align=center | 4.1
|-
| Lentils || 1 cup cooked (198 g) || align=center | 5.0 || align=center | 2.5
|-
| Cold pasta || 1 cup (160g) || align=center | 1.9 || align=center | 1.2
|-
| Pearl barley || 1 cup cooked (157 g) || align=center | 3.2 || align=center | 2.03
|-
| Cold potato || 1/2" diameter || align=center | 0.6 – 0.8
|-
| Oatmeal || 1 cup cooked (234 g) || align=center | 0.5 || align=center | 0.2
|}

The Institute of Medicine Panel on the Definition of Dietary Fiber proposed two definitions: functional fiber as "isolated, nondigestible carbohydrates that have beneficial physiological effects in humans", and dietary fiber as "nondigestible carbohydrates and lignin that are intrinsic and intact in plants."  They also proposed that the prior classifications of soluble versus insoluble be phased out and replaced with viscous versus fermentable for each specific fiber.

Uses

In food
Starch has been consumed by people and animals for thousands of years.  Thus, foods containing resistant starch are already commonly consumed.

It has been estimated that average resistant starch intake in developed countries ranges from 3–6 grams/day for Northern Europeans, Australians and Americans, 8.5 grams/day for Italians and 10–15 grams/day in Indian and Chinese diets. The higher consumption of starch-containing foods like pasta and rice likely accounts for higher intake of resistant starch in Italy, India and China.

Several studies have found that the traditional African diet is high in resistant starch. Rural black South Africans consume an average of 38 grams of resistant starch per day by having cooked and cooled corn porridge and beans in their diets.

RS2 resistant starch from high amylose wheat and high amylose corn can be baked into foods, usually replacing flour or other high glycemic carbohydrates.

Isolated
Isolated and extracted resistant starch and foods rich in resistant starch have been used to fortify foods to increase their dietary fiber content. Typically, food fortification utilizes RS2 resistant starch from high amylose corn or high amylose wheat, RS3 resistant starch from cassava and RS4 resistant starch from wheat and potato, as these sources can survive varying degrees of food processing without losing their resistant starch content.

Resistant starch has a small particle size, white appearance, bland flavor and low water-holding capacity. Resistant starch typically replaces flour in foods such as bread and other baked goods, pasta, cereal and batters because it can produce foods with similar color and texture of the original food. It has also been used for its textural properties in imitation cheese.

Some types of resistant starch are used as dietary supplements in the United States. RS2 from potato starch and green banana starch maintain their resistance as long as they are consumed raw and unheated. If they are heated or baked, these types of starch may become rapidly digestible.

References 

Starch
Prebiotics (nutrition)
Food additives